Rosenberg is a city in the U.S. state of Texas, within the Houston–The Woodlands–Sugar Land metropolitan area and Fort Bend County. Rosenberg was named for Henry Von Rosenberg who emigrated to Texas from Switzerland in 1843. Von Rosenberg was an important figure in the settlement of Fort Bend County and the Gulf Coast region. The population was 38,282 at the 2020 census, up from 30,618 at the 2010 census. The community holds the Fort Bend County fair in October. Rosenberg is adjacent to the city of Richmond, the Fort Bend County seat.

History 
Rosenberg is named after Henry Rosenberg, who migrated from Switzerland to Galveston, Texas in 1843. Rosenberg was the first president of the Gulf, Colorado and Santa Fe Railway.

Geography 

Rosenberg is located in central Fort Bend County at  (29.552388, –95.804899), on the south side of the Brazos River. It is bordered to the northeast by Richmond, to the south by Pleak, and to the southwest by Beasley.

The Southwest Freeway (I-69 and US-59) runs through the south side of Rosenberg, bypassing the city center. The freeway leads northeast  to downtown Houston, and US-59 continues southwest  to Victoria and beyond.

Climate 

The climate in this area is characterized by hot, humid summers and generally mild to cool winters.  According to the Köppen climate classification system, Rosenberg has a humid subtropical climate, Cfa on climate maps.

Demographics 

As of the 2020 United States census, there were 38,282 people, 12,636 households, and 8,613 families residing in the city.

At the 2000 census, there were 24,043 people, 7,933 households and 5,976 families residing in the city. The population density was 1,131.7 per square mile (436.8/km). There were 8,438 housing units at an average density of 397.2 per square mile (153.3/km). The racial makeup of the city was 65.69% White, 8.53% African American, 0.37% Native American, 0.38% Asian, 0.04% Pacific Islander, 22.17% from other races, and 2.81% from two or more races. Hispanic or Latino of any race were 54.96% of the population.

There were 7,933 households, of which 41.3% had children under the age of 18 living with them, 53.4% were married couples living together, 15.7% had a female householder with no husband present, and 24.7% were non-families. 20.8% of all households were made up of individuals, and 8.1% had someone living alone who was 65 years of age or older. The average household size was 3.00 and the average family size was 3.48.

30.9% of the population were under the age of 18, 10.8% from 18 to 24, 30.0% from 25 to 44, 18.5% from 45 to 64, and 9.8% who were 65 years of age or older. The median age was 30 years. For every 100 females, there were 98.6 males. For every 100 females age 18 and over, there were 95.2 males.

The median household income was $35,510 and the median family income was $39,965. Males had a median income of $28,723 versus $21,945 for females. The per capita income for the city was $14,814. About 13.6% of families and 16.1% of the population were below the poverty line, including 20.7% of those under age 18 and 12.9% of those age 65 or over.

Arts and culture 
Fort Bend County Libraries operates the George Memorial Library, the main library, in Richmond. The main library was originally located in Rosenberg, near the Polly Ryon hospital. The library moved to Richmond in 1986. The library underwent extensive renovations in 2013 and reopened with new technology, media rooms, and room design.

Parks and recreation 
The City of Rosenberg operates nine municipal parks within the city limits.

Fort Bend County operates the Bud O'Shieles Community Center in Rosenberg. The two acre center includes an auditorium, meeting centers, and centers for elderly people.

Education

Public schools

Rosenberg is served by the Lamar Consolidated Independent School District.

Elementary schools in Rosenberg include Arredondo, Bowie, Jackson, Taylor Ray and Travis.

Middle and high schools in Rosenberg include Wessendorf Middle School, Lamar Junior High School, Navarro Middle School, George Junior High School, Lamar Consolidated High School, and B.F. Terry High School.

Additionally Wright Junior High School (grades 6-8), and Randle High School serve sections of Rosenberg; they are in an unincorporated area.

Private schools 

 Holy Rosary Catholic School, a K–8 school operated by the Roman Catholic Archdiocese of Galveston-Houston.
 Living Water Christian School, an early childhood-grade 11 Christian school in Rosenberg.

Infrastructure 
Fort Bend County does not have a hospital district. OakBend Medical Center serves as the county's charity hospital, which the county contracts with.

Transportation 
Fort Bend County Public Transportation provides local bus service and commuter service to Houston.

Greyhound Bus Lines serves the Rosenberg Station at Raceway gas station.

Notable people 
Randal Grichuk, Major League Baseball player currently with the Colorado Rockies; played on the 2008 Lamar Consolidated Baseball Regional Finalist Team as well as the 2004 Little League World Series team
John Holiday, operatic countertenor
Dexter Pittman, professional basketball player currently with the Houston Rockets of the NBA; attended B. F. Terry High School
Clymer Wright, former editor of Fort Bend Reporter; conservative political activist in Greater Houston

Notes

References

External links 

 City of Rosenberg official website
 Rosenberg Convention and Visitors Bureau

 
Cities in Fort Bend County, Texas
Cities in Texas
Greater Houston
Czech-American culture in Texas